Rampworx is an indoor skatepark in Aintree, Liverpool, England. It caters for rollerbladers, skateboarders, BMX riders and  scooter riders.

References

Rampworx Skatepark all set for fundraising push (Liverpool Echo, 17 October 2012)
Plans to expand skate park in Netherton gets go ahead (Liverpool Echo, 11 April 2013)
Plans for Wirral indoor skateboard park revealed by Geoff Barnes (Wirral Globe, 16 March 2013)
Rampworx - Video Collection (Transworld BMX)
Laced Series at Rampworx Skatepark 2013 (One Rollerblading Magazine, 5 February 2013)

External links
 Rampworx Skatepark - Liverpool, The UK's biggest indoor skatepark

Sport in the Metropolitan Borough of Sefton
Skateparks in the United Kingdom
Sports venues in Merseyside
Buildings and structures in the Metropolitan Borough of Sefton